The 1976 NAIA Soccer Championship was the 18th annual tournament held by the NAIA to determine the national champion of men's college soccer among its members in the United States and Canada.

Simon Fraser defeated Rockhurst in the final, 1–0, to claim the Clan's first NAIA national title. This was the first title for a team from Canada.

The final was  played in Pasadena, California.

Qualification

The tournament field remained fixed at eight teams. Third-, fifth-, and seventh-placed finals remained in place alongside the national championship match.

Bracket

See also  
 1976 NCAA Division I Soccer Tournament
 1976 NCAA Division II Soccer Championship
 1976 NCAA Division III Soccer Championship

References 

NAIA championships
NAIA
1976 in sports in California